Fordham railway station is a disused railway station that served the village of Fordham, Cambridgeshire.

Opened in 1879, the station formed the junction between the Cambridge to Mildenhall railway and the Ipswich to Ely Line in England.  The Mildenhall branch closed to passengers in 1962 followed by the station in 1965.

The site today
The yard and buildings were used in turn by a roofing/scaffolding contractor, and as a waste management depot.  In March 2009 a planning application was submitted to Cambridgeshire County Council proposing to demolish the station and replace it with a recycling centre.

Trains still pass the site on the Ipswich to Ely Line.

References

External links
 Fordham at Disused Stations

Disused railway stations in Cambridgeshire
Former Great Eastern Railway stations
Railway stations in Great Britain opened in 1879
Railway stations in Great Britain closed in 1965